The  is a Japanese Go competition.

Outline
The Women's Honinbo is the female version of the Honinbo. It is sponsored by the Kyodo News Agency and Sompo Japan Insurance. The winner's purse is 5,500,000 yen.

Past winners

Winners in chronological order:

Winners by number of titles:

References

External links
 Nihon Ki-in archive (in Japanese)
 The Female Honinbo Tournament
 Women's Honinbo title games

Go competitions in Japan